Cynthia Makris is a soprano opera singer whose professional career has spanned nearly thirty years.

She was born 1956 in Sterling, Colorado, USA, and has a Bachelor of Arts degree in History and Music Performance from Adams State College. Makris has sung major soprano roles at La Scala and the Royal Opera House, the Finnish National Opera and many other opera houses. She has performed in Europe, South America, and Asia. Her repertoire ranges from coloratura to dramatic roles including the title role in Salome by Richard Strauss. For Opera Queensland she sang Abigaille in Verdi's Nabucco in 2007 and Turandot in 2008.

Makris won the Metropolitan Opera Regional award for young singers as well the San Francisco Opera Regional award two consecutive years during her graduate studies in vocal performance at the University of Colorado at Boulder. Her first professional role was as Tosca with the Denver Lyric Opera Company. She received an award in 1982 from the German state of North Rhine-Westphalia for her performance of the three heroines in The Tales of Hoffmann''. She was Artist of the Year of the Savonlinna Opera Festival in 2006, an award for her contribution to the festival since 1993, when she sang Lady Macbeth in 's televised production of Verdi's opera.

Makris is a vocal teacher and an NLP (Neurolinguistic Programming) practitioner as well as a life coach and a Reiki Master. She is married to Finnish tenor, Raimo Sirkiä and has a son. She lives in Florida, US, and in Helsinki, Finland.

Repertoire

References

External links
 
 

1956 births
Living people
American operatic sopranos
Adams State University alumni
People from Sterling, Colorado
Reiki practitioners
21st-century American women